Castro Pretorio is a station on Line B of the Rome Metro. It was opened on 8 December 1990 and is located on Viale Castro Pretorio, at its junction with Via San Martino della Battaglia, in the Castro Pretorio rione. Its exit overlooks the Castra Praetoria (the camp of the Praetorian Guard), now the site of the Biblioteca Nazionale Centrale.

Surroundings 
 Biblioteca Nazionale Centrale di Roma
 Castra praetoria
 Porta Pia
 Porta Nomentana
 Arch of Sixtus V
 Piazza dell'Indipendenza
 Piazza della Croce Rossa
 Ministry of Transport (main HQ)
 Ferrovie dello Stato Group (main HQ)
 quartiere San Lorenzo
 Città Universitaria

References

External links 
The station on the site of ATAC.

Rome Metro Line B stations
Railway stations opened in 1990
1990 establishments in Italy
Rome R. XVIII Castro Pretorio
Railway stations in Italy opened in the 20th century